The 2013 Rally Guanajuato México was a motor racing event for rally cars that was held over four days between 7 and 10 March, which marked the 27th running of the Rally México. The rally was based in the town of León, Guanajuato.

The rally was the third round of the 2013 World Rally Championship season, and marked the fortieth anniversary of the World Rally Championship. Thirteen World Rally Car crews were entered in the event. It was the first WRC event since the 2006 Rally GB where reigning World Rally Champion Sébastien Loeb has not featured on the entry list as he elected not to enter Rally México as part of his four-race 'retirement' season. Loeb has won every Rally México since 2006. Since there is no previous Rally Mexico winner competing in the 2013 event, it is guaranteed that there will be a new winner.

Entry list
Thirteen World Rally Cars were entered into the event, as were six entries in the newly formed WRC-2 championship for cars built to Group N and Super 2000 regulations. There were no WRC-3 entries.

Results

Event standings

Special stages

Notable retirements

References

External links
 Rally official website
 The official website of the World Rally Championship

Mexico
Rally Mexico
Rally